The following is the discography of Fitz and the Tantrums, a Los Angeles-based indie pop band formed in 2008 by Michael Fitzpatrick (lead vocals).

Studio albums

Extended plays

Singles

Promotional singles

Other charting songs

Videos

Music videos

Notes

References

External links
 Official website
 Fitz and the Tantrums at AllMusic
 

Discographies of American artists
Discography